Manfrotto is a Venetian brand of camera and lighting supports, including tripods, monopods, and other accessories, that is manufactured by Lino Manfrotto + Co. Spa, a company headquartered in Cassola, Italy. The brand is wholly-owned by Videndum plc.

History
Lino Manfrotto, an Italian photojournalist, began designing and selling light stands, booms, and telescopic rods under the name "Manfrotto" in the late 1960s. In 1972 Lino Manfrotto met Gilberto Battocchio, a technician working for a Bassano mechanical firm. With the collaboration, the company introduced its first tripod in 1974. By 1986 Manfrotto already had six manufacturing plants in Bassano, and in the following two years they would build five more plants in Villapaiera, the industrial zone of Feltre.

Vinten Group purchased Manfrotto in 1989, followed by the French company Gitzo in 1992 and the American company Bogen Photo Corp. in 1993. Vinten Group chose to maintain the brands as separate lines in its portfolio. Manfrotto products are distributed in Germany, France, Italy, Japan, the United Kingdom and the United States by Manfrotto Distribution. In Canada, Manfrotto products are distributed by Gentec International.

In 2010 Manfrotto established the Manfrotto School of Xcellence, an educational resource to support and help everyone to get closer to photography and videography.

Lino Manfrotto died on February 5, 2017, at the age of 80.

Advertising campaigns 
In 2010 Manfrotto changed its brand slogan from "Manfrotto Proven Professional" to "Manfrotto Imagine More". In May 2011 Manfrotto launched an online competition asking people to share short posts about imagination on Twitter and Facebook for the Manfrotto Imagine More Manifesto, as well as to submit pictures representing imagination on the Manfrotto Imagine More website. A short film was then created based around the winning posts and pictures, debuting at the 68th Venice International Film Festival. In July 2012 Manfrotto launched the Manfrotto Imagine More blog, a web resource with tips on how to get the best out of pictures and how to share them with other people more effectively.

References

External links

 
 Manfrotto School of Xcellence Website (COM)
 Manfrotto Imagine More Website (COM)
 Manfrotto Official Facebook Page

Photography equipment
Photography companies of Italy
Companies based in Veneto
Italian brands